Brachyotum campii is a species of plant in the family Melastomataceae. It is endemic to Ecuador.  Its natural habitats are subtropical or tropical high-altitude shrubland and subtropical or tropical high-altitude grassland.

References

campii
Endemic flora of Ecuador
Near threatened plants
Taxonomy articles created by Polbot